Charles Arthur Ching  (7 October 1935–30 November 2000) was a judge in Hong Kong.

Born Charles Arthur Ching into an intellectual family in Hong Kong, Ching was educated in Hong Kong and England. He was a scholar both at King's College, Taunton and at University College, Oxford, where he graduated with honours in jurisprudence.

After passing his bar exam in 1959, Ching commenced his practice of law in Hong Kong, and was appointed Queen's Counsel in 1974. During this period, he was regarded by some as the most successful barrister in Hong Kong's history.

Ching was later appointed to the Court of Appeal in 1995 and the Court of Final Appeal in 1997, where he served with distinction. He resigned in 2000 due to health reasons and died soon after. A scholarship named after him was set up by the Hong Kong Bar Association. Throughout his career both as advocate and as judge Mr. Justice Ching was an advocate for the merging of the legal professions in Hong Kong (barristers and solicitors).

References

1935 births
2000 deaths
People educated at King's College, Taunton
Alumni of University College, Oxford
Hong Kong judges
Recipients of the Grand Bauhinia Medal
British Hong Kong judges
Reform Club of Hong Kong politicians
Hong Kong Senior Counsel
Barristers of Hong Kong
Hong Kong Queen's Counsel